Konstantin Wolff (born 12 October 1978 in Lahn-Gießen) is a German operatic bass baritone.

Life 
Wolff studied with Donald Litaker at the Hochschule für Musik Karlsruhe and benefited a scholarship. He made his opera debut in 2005 at the Opéra National de Lyon under the direction of William Christie in Monteverdi's L’incoronazione di Poppea.

Awards 
 2004: Felix Mendelssohn Bartholdy Prize.

References

External links 
 
 

German bass-baritones
1978 births
Living people
People from Giessen